Tree Cities of the World is a worldwide programme managed by the Food and Agriculture Organization of the United Nations (FAO) and the Arbor Day Foundation in the US, whereby municipalities of any size can apply to earn the designation "Tree City of the World".

The programme was launched at the first World Forum on Urban Forests held in October 2018 in Mantua, Italy, in 2018 by the FAO and Arbor Day Foundation. The aim is to celebrate and recognise cities and towns of all sizes throughout the world which have shown a commitment to maintaining their urban forests. From the end of 2019, any municipal government which has responsibility for its trees were able to apply to become a designated Tree City of the World. The  goal shared by both organisations is "to foster a robust and diverse network of communities, practitioners, advocates, and scientists that will lead to sustainable urban forests across the globe".

The Tree City USA programme began in 1976, co-sponsored by the National Association of State Foresters and the United States Forest Service, established a method by which the forest managers could be assisted in their work and recognised for it. However the importance of urban forests has been realised as even more vital in a time of global warming, pollution and crowded cities, adding to the well-being of residents and workers of villages, suburbs, towns and cities.

Five core standards are necessary to be met by a Tree City of the World:

Establish responsibility for the trees.
Set the rules – policies, best practices, or industry standards for management of the trees.
Know what you have: create an inventory of all of the trees in the municipality.
Allocate resources from the annual budget.
Celebrate the achievements, to acknowledge those who do the work and to help raise awareness among the public of the importance of trees.

On 4 February 2020, 59 cities were announced as having achieved the designation of Tree City of the World. There were 27 in the United States, with the rest scattered across the world, from large cities such as New York City and San Francisco, European cities such as Milan, to smaller municipalities such as and the Adelaide suburb of Burnside in South Australia, and Queenstown in New Zealand. At that time, around 100 other cities had also pledged to participate in the next round. 

Applications are required to renewed annually for continuing recognition.

See also
European City of the Trees, an award given by the European Arboricultural Council
List of Tree Cities USA, under the US programme established in 1976
Million Tree Initiative, a commitment made by cities to plant a million trees
Trees for Cities, a UK not-for-profit dedicated to planting trees in cities

References

External links

2019 establishments
Urban forestry
Forestry initiatives